Ivo Minář was the defending champion, however he lost to Pere Riba in the first round.
Pere Riba won in the final 6–3 (and retirement), against Steve Darcis.

Seeds

Draw

Finals

Top half

Bottom half

References
 Main Draw
 Qualifying Draw

Open Barletta - Citta della Disfida - Singles
2010 Singles